Roberta is a city in Crawford County, Georgia, United States. The population was 1,007 at the 2010 census. It is part of the Macon Metropolitan Statistical Area.

History

Creek Agency

In the early nineteenth century, Indian agent Benjamin Hawkins built his plantation on the Flint River near Roberta. This was also a trading post and the Creek Agency.

New Knoxville
Originally in Crawford County, Knoxville was the only stop in the county, until the A&F Railroad bypassed it by about a mile to the southwest when it was built in 1888. A train station was built, and a new town sprang up. People migrated towards this new town, called "New Knoxville."

Hiram David McCrary allowed the railroad to use part of his land, and was given naming rights to the town, which he named "Roberta" for his 7-year-old daughter. McCrary later became the owner of the first general store in Roberta, was its first elected mayor, co-owned its first motel, and served as tax collector and a railroad station agent.

In 1910, Roberta was incorporated as a city and was expanded in every direction by 1200 yards.

In 1949, the original train depot burned. It was replaced about a year later by a smaller concrete block building. A replica of the original depot was built in 2003 and currently houses the Chamber of Commerce Welcome Center.

Rise and demise
With the construction of the A&F Railroad and U.S. Highway 341, Roberta became a rapidly growing tourist town, with restaurants and hotels springing up. However, in the 1940s, passenger rail service ended in Roberta, ending one of the two main traffic flows. A decade later, Interstate 75 bypassed Roberta to the east, diverting much traffic. After these events, Roberta relaxed into a more small-town setting.

Geography

Roberta is located near the center of Crawford County at  (32.721283, -84.012512). U.S. Route 80 passes through the city, leading east  to Macon and west  to Columbus. U.S. Route 341 crosses US 80 in the city center, leading north  to Barnesville and southeast  to Perry.

The city is located roughly on the fall line of the eastern U.S., meaning that it is located between the hillier Piedmont region to the north and the flatter Atlantic coastal plain to the south.

Demographics

2020 census

As of the 2020 United States census, there were 813 people, 354 households, and 206 families residing in the city.

2000 census
As of the census of 2000, there were 808 people, 304 households, and 200 families residing in the city. The racial makeup of the city was 48.76% White, 48.27% African American, 0.12% Native American, 0.74% Asian, 0.50% from other races, and 1.61% from two or more races. Hispanic or Latino of any race were 0.62% of the population.

There were 304 households, out of which 32.6% had children under the age of 18 living with them, 33.9% were married couples living together, 29.9% had a female householder with no husband present, and 34.2% were non-families. 31.6% of all households were made up of individuals, and 16.4% had someone living alone who was 65 years of age or older.  The average household size was 2.36 and the average family size was 2.96.

In the city, the population was spread out, with 26.9% under the age of 18, 6.9% from 18 to 24, 22.5% from 25 to 44, 22.5% from 45 to 64, and 21.2% who were 65 years of age or older.  The median age was 40 years. For every 100 females, there were 76.0 males.  For every 100 females age 18 and over, there were 66.9 males.

The median income for a household in the city was $25,625, and the median income for a family was $33,125. Males had a median income of $32,125 versus $18,625 for females. The per capita income for the city was $14,536.  About 25.1% of families and 29.1% of the population were below the poverty line, including 39.6% of those under age 18 and 32.6% of those age 65 or over.

Education

Crawford County School District 
The Crawford County School District holds grades pre-school to grade twelve, and consists of one elementary school, a middle school, and a high school. The district has 127 full-time teachers and over 2,090 students.
Crawford County Elementary School
Crawford County Middle School
Crawford County High School

Tourism

The city has a restored 1962 Seaboard Coastline caboose next to the railroad depot in the downtown area. The caboose holds a small history of Roberta's railroad heritage and a memorial to employees of Southern Railroad. 
Also in the downtown block is the Benjamin Hawkins Monument, constructed in 1931.

References

External links
City of Roberta official website
 

Cities in Georgia (U.S. state)
Cities in Crawford County, Georgia
Macon metropolitan area, Georgia